Stefan Kobel (born 13 February 1974 in Winterthur) is a Swiss beach volleyball player.  With his partner Patrick Heuscher he won the bronze medal at the 2004 Summer Olympics.

References
 Stefan Kobel at the Beach Volleyball Database

1974 births
Living people
Swiss beach volleyball players
Men's beach volleyball players
Beach volleyball players at the 2004 Summer Olympics
Olympic beach volleyball players of Switzerland
Olympic bronze medalists for Switzerland
Olympic medalists in beach volleyball
Medalists at the 2004 Summer Olympics
People from Winterthur
Sportspeople from the canton of Zürich